Nevada is a state in the southwestern part of the United States.

Nevada may also refer to:

Places

Bosnia and Herzegovina
 Nevada, Ravno

Serbia
 Nevada, Kuršumlija

Spain
 Nevada, Granada

United States

Cities and towns
 Nevada, Illinois
 Nevada, Indiana
 Nevada, Iowa
 Nevada, Missouri
 Nevada, Ohio
 Nevada, Texas

Counties
 Nevada County, Arkansas
 Nevada County, California

Natural features
 Nevada Fall, a waterfall on the Merced River in Yosemite National Park
 Nevada Gulch, a valley in South Dakota

Arts, entertainment and media

Films
 Nevada (1927 film), a film starring Gary Cooper
 Nevada (1935 film), a film starring Buster Crabbe
 Nevada (1944 film), a film starring Robert Mitchum
 Nevada (1997 film), a film directed by Gary Tieche

Literature 
 Nevada (Binnie novel), a 2013 novel by Imogen Binnie
 Nevada (Grey novel), a 1927 novel by Zane Grey

Music

Groups
 Nevada (Portuguese band), a Portuguese duo
 Nevada (UK band), a British folk/progressive rock band

Songs
"Nevada" (song), by YoungBoy Never Broke Again
"Nevada", song by Riders in the Sky from Prairie Serenade
 "Nevada", song by Vicetone featuring Cozi Zuehlsdorff
 "Nevada", song by John Linnell from State Songs

Other uses in arts, entertainment, and media
 Nevada (comics), a comic series published by DC under its Vertigo imprint
 Supershow Nevada, a Bulgarian TV game show

Other uses
 Nevada, the development code name for the Solaris release following Solaris 10
 Nevada Solar One, a solar power plant in Nevada, United States
 Renault Nevada, a model of automobile
 University of Nevada, Reno
 Nevada Wolf Pack, the school's athletic program
 USS Nevada, a United States naval vessel
 Nevada-tan, a nickname given to the perpetrator of the Sasebo Slashing

See also
 Nevada City (disambiguation)
 Nevada County (disambiguation)
 Nevada Township (disambiguation)
 Sierra Nevada (disambiguation)